Beachwood is a city in eastern Cuyahoga County, Ohio, United States, and a suburb of Cleveland. As of the 2020 census the city's population was 14,040.

History

The land that eventually became Beachwood was originally part of the Connecticut Western Reserve. Before becoming an independent municipality, Beachwood was part of Warrensville Township. In 1915, it seceded from Warrensville after the Township voted to close a nearby area school. A petition was organized, and on June 26, 1915, Beachwood was incorporated into an independent village. In 1960, Beachwood had reached the number of residents to attain city status under the Ohio Revised Code.

Beachwood was named for the numerous Beech trees that grew throughout the village. The origin of the spelling of the city is disputed. Upon incorporation, the city's name was originally spelled, "Beechwood". One popular theory is that an early village hall clerk misspelled the name on some official documents, giving rise to the current spelling.

In 1948, a village wide debate was sparked after the proposal of the construction of the Anshe Chesed Fairmount Temple following the purchase of 32 acres of land on which the temple currently stands. The debate started due to the growing trend of families moving to the suburbs due to the booming post WWII economy. Considering that Beachwood at the time was a small community with few Jews, the sudden proposal of the large synagogue of 1,800 families sparked anti-Semitic worries among the village's community due to the imminent demographics change that the establishment of a large synagogue would bring. The village council, no member of which was Jewish, cited in 1952 that the establishment of Anshe Chesed "would be detrimental to the public safety, welfare, and convenience of the village". One morning in May 1952, following Anshe Chesed's threat to sue the village of Beachwood, residents opened their mailboxes and found a white supremacist newspaper called The Plain Truth, with the message: 

Zoning arguments between the village and the congregation regarding the temple's construction led to the Ohio Supreme Court ruling in 1954 that the synagogue must be allowed to be built, as well as issuing state building permits to the congregation. The temple's construction was finished in 1957.

Since the late 1950s, multiple other synagogues relocated to Beachwood, establishing the Jewish influence on the growth of the community.

Geography
Beachwood is located at  (41.482226, −81.504001).

Demographics

2000 census
As of the census of 2000, there were 12,186 people, 5,074 households, and 3,181 families living in the city. The population density was 2,307.5 people per square mile (891.1/km2). There were 5,447 housing units at an average density of 1,031.4 per square mile (398.8/km2). The racial makeup of the city is 86.50% White, 9.08% African American, 0.08% Native American, 3.21% Asian, 0.02% Pacific Islander, 0.15% from other races, and 0.97% from two or more races. Hispanic or Latino of any race were 0.78% of the population.

There were 5,074 households, out of which 24.1% had children under the age of 18 living with them. 56.0% were married couples living together, 5.1% had a female householder with no husband present, and 37.3% were non-families. 35.2% of all households were made up of individuals, and 23.5% had someone living alone who was 65 years of age or older. The average household size was 2.20 and the average family size was 2.86.

In the city the population was spread out, with 19.7% under the age of 18, 3.0% from 18 to 24, 17.2% from 25 to 44, 24.6% from 45 to 64, and 35.4% who were 65 years of age or older. The median age was 52 years. For every 100 females, there were 78.8 males. For every 100 females age 18 and over, there were 71.8 males.

The median income for a household in the city was $65,406, and the median income for a family was $86,632. Males had a median income of $71,829 versus $35,375 for females. The per capita income for the village was $40,509. About 2.5% of families and 4.3% of the population were below the poverty line, including 4.3% of those under the age of 18 and 5.0% of those 65 and older.

Of the city's population over the age of 25, 57.3% held a bachelor's degree or higher.  Cleveland Jewish News claimed that 89.5 percent of Beachwood's population is Jewish.

2010 census
As of the census of 2010, there were 11,953 people, 5,064 households, and 3,005 families living in the city. The racial makeup of the city was 77.3% White, 13.7% African American, 7.4% Asian, 0.4% from other races, and 1.2% from two or more races. Hispanic or Latino of any race were 1.9% of the population.

There were 5,064 households, of which 24.9% had children under the age of 18 living with them, 50.1% were married couples living together, 7.3% had a female householder with no husband present, 2.0% had a male householder with no wife present, and 40.7% were non-families. 37.4% of all households were made up of individuals, and 23.9% had someone living alone who was 65 years of age or older. The average household size was 2.16 and the average family size was 2.88.

The median age in the city was 52.5 years. 19.6% of residents were under the age of 18; 3.9% were between the ages of 18 and 24; 17.2% were from 25 to 44; 27.2% were from 45 to 64; and 32.3% were 65 years of age or older. The gender makeup of the city was 44.3% male and 55.7% female.

Jewish community

Since its development in the 1950s, Beachwood has been a destination for the Jewish community in the Greater Cleveland area. Following WWII, Jewish families from inner city neighborhoods such as Glenville began relocating to established communities in the city's eastern suburbs. Today, with approximately 90% of the Beachwood's population identifying as Jewish, the city has the fourth largest per capita Jewish population of any municipality outside of Israel. Beachwood's Jewish establishment is rooted in decades of development of various Jewish institutions, such as synagogues, Jewish schools, The Maltz Museum of Jewish Heritage, Menorah Park Center for Assisted Living, the Mandel Jewish Community Center, the Jewish Federation of Cleveland, and many Jewish owned restaurants, stores and other businesses. Beachwood's rapid growth from village to city status is attributed to the influx of Jewish families seeking suburban homes, naturally forming an ethnic enclave. Most of the homes built in Beachwood between the 1940s and the 1990s were developed by Jewish owned companies, down to the lumber used to build the structures themselves. Beachwood's Jewish community is also reflected in the city's public schools, with Hebrew being offered as a foreign language at the local Middle and High School, making Beachwood one of the only public schools in the United States to do so.

Economy
Beachwood is home to University Hospitals Ahuja Medical Center, and several offices affiliated with the Cleveland Clinic including the Beachwood Family Health and Surgery Center.

Corporate headquarters located in Beachwood include:
Eaton Corporation
SITE Centers
OMNOVA Solutions
TOA Technologies.
Cleveland Jewish News

Retail attractions in Beachwood include Beachwood Place and the adjacent LaPlace Center, an upscale shopping center. The city is also home to Canterbury Golf Club, a USGA member course which has hosted PGA Tour events and has been ranked among top 100 courses in the United States by Golf Digest magazine.

Recreation and museums

Beachwood is home to Preston's H.O.P.E. - the largest fully accessible playground in Northeast Ohio.

The Maltz Museum of Jewish Heritage is located in Beachwood and is dedicated to furthering an understanding of Jewish immigrant history and culture in the U.S.

The David Berger National Memorial is the country's smallest National Memorial, honoring the legacy of Jewish-Clevelander Olympian David Mark Berger.

Education
The Beachwood City Schools consists of:

Fairmount Early Childhood Center: Pre-kindergarten.
Bryden Elementary School: K through 2nd grade.
Hilltop Elementary School: 3rd through 5th grade .
Beachwood Middle School: 6th through 8th grade.
Beachwood High School: 9th through 12th grade.

There are three parochial Jewish schools located in Beachwood:

Fuchs Mizrachi School, an Orthodox Jewish school; Pre-kindergarten through 12th grade.
Beatrice J. Stone Yavne High School: All girls, Orthodox Jewish school; 7th through 12th grade.
Mandel Jewish Day School (Previously known as Agnon Day School): Jewish day school; Pre-kindergarten through 8th grade.

Notable people
Armond Budish – former Speaker of the House of Ohio, former Cuyahoga County Executive.
Mike Chernoff – baseball general manager of the Cleveland Guardians
Marc Cohn – Grammy Award-winning singer-songwriter known for his 1991 hit 'Walking in Memphis'
Samuel Glazer – co-founder of Mr. Coffee
Brad Goldberg – major league baseball pitcher.
 Josh Mandel – former Ohio State Treasurer.
 Alex Wyse – Broadway performer.

Surrounding communities

References

External links

 
 City of Beachwood (official site)

 
Cities in Ohio
Cities in Cuyahoga County, Ohio
Jewish communities in the United States
Jews and Judaism in Ohio
Russian-American culture in Ohio
Russian-Jewish culture in the United States
Cleveland metropolitan area
1915 establishments in Ohio